This is a list of football clubs located in Greenland, sorted alphabetically, and including geographical provenience, home stadium information and number of Greenlandic Men's Football Championship won.

See also
Football in Greenland
Football Association of Greenland
Greenland national football team
Greenlandic Men's Football Championship

Greenland
 

Football clubs